The European Sociological Association (ESA) is an academic association of European sociologists with over 2800 members. It is a member of the Initiative for Science in Europe and the International Sociological Association.

History
ESA was established in 1994-95. Subsequent to  the collapse of the Soviet system in Europe, several groups of sociologists founded the European Sociological Association (ESA), which in 2013 had about 1800 individual members and 28 national organizations.

Mission
ESA aims to facilitate sociological research, teaching and communication on European issues, to build networks between European sociologists and to give sociology a voice in European affairs. ESA publishes journals European Societies and European Journal of Cultural and Political Sociology as well as the ESA conferences. Bristol University Press publishing the Emotions and Society journal in association with the ESA Research Network on Sociology of Emotions.

Presidents
The following persons have been presidents of the association:
1995-1997: Sylvia Walby, University of Leeds
1997-1999: Martin Kohli, European University Institute
1999-2001: , Central European University
2001-2003: Yasemin Soysal, University of Essex
2003-2005: Jeja-Pekka Roos, University of Helsinki
2005-2007: Giovanna Procacci, University of Milan
2007-2009: Claire Wallace, University of Aberdeen
2009-2011: Analia Torres, Instituto Universitário de Lisboa
2011-2013: Pekka Sulkunen, University of Helsinki
2013-2015: Carmen Leccardi, University of Milan-Bicocca
2015-2017: Frank Welz, University of Innsbruck
2017-2019: Sue Scott, Newcastle University
2019-2021: Marta Soler-Gallart, University of Barcelona

Conferences
The association organizes an international conference every second year. Each conference has a specific theme.

References

External links
 

Educational organizations based in Europe
Organizations based in Paris
Sociological organizations